The Oakbank Easter Racing Carnival is a horse-racing meeting held over two days by the Oakbank Racing Club at the Oakbank Racecourse located in the Adelaide Hills in South Australia. The carnival is a mixture of flat and jumping races with between two and four jumps races on day one and two feature jumping races on day two.

Day one is held on Easter Saturday and is one of the highest attended race days in Australia. The Von Doussa Steeplechase (named after founder Alfred von Doussa) used to place on day one and was a preliminary to the Great Eastern Steeplechase held on Easter Monday. A "classic" hurdle race takes place on Monday as does the feature flat race, the Onkaparinga Cup.

The meeting is conducted by the Oakbank Racing Club and is popular with families and groups. Although ostensibly a horse race meeting, Oakbank is an event in itself with carnival rides, picnics and other activities. Many families camp for the whole weekend in the paddocks adjacent to the track, and some have done so all their lives.

Patrons travelled by train from Adelaide to nearby Balhannah railway station,  from the course, from 1884. When the Mount Pleasant railway line opened in 1918, a platform was constructed adjacent to the course, permitting special race trains to run direct to the course the following Easter. The line to Mount Pleasant closed on 3 March 1963, thus the race trains ran no more.

On October 1st 2021 it was announced that jumps racing will no longer be conducted in South Australia mainly due to the small number of South Australian jumps horses. There were plans to run the Great Eastern and Von Doussa Steeplechase as a flat race. However on 3rd March 2022 it was announced that would not happen. However, many jumps racing supporters attempted to keep jumps racing at Oakbank and that fight went into the South Australian Court System. That would result in an election occurring which the anti-jumps faction won but debate surrounding that vote spilled into more legal action. But not long after the South Australian Government stepped in and outlawed jumps racing in the state.

References

External links
 Entrance to Oakbank racecourse - Google Street View

Horse racing in Australia
Horse racing meetings
Carnivals in Australia
Equestrian festivals